Chub Sorkh (also Romanized as Chūb Sorkh) is a village in Tolbozan Rural District, Golgir District, Masjed Soleyman County, Khuzestan Province, Iran. At the 2006 census, its population was 42, in 8 families.

References 

Populated places in Masjed Soleyman County